Eastman Color Negative (ECN) is a photographic processing system created by Kodak in the 1950s for the development of monopack color negative motion picture film stock. It is part of the Eastmancolor family of products sold by Eastman Kodak.

The original process, known as ECN-1, was used from the 1950s to the mid-1970s, and involved development at approximately 25°C for around 7–9 minutes. Later research enabled faster development and more environmentally friendly film and process (and thus quicker photo lab turnaround time).

This process allowed a higher development temperature of 41.1°C for around three minutes. This new environmentally friendly development process is known as ECN-2.  It is the standard development process for all modern motion picture color negative developing, including Fujifilm and other non-Kodak film manufacturers. All film stocks are specifically created for a particular development process, thus ECN-1 film could not be put into an ECN-2 development bath since the designs are incompatible.

The ECN-2 process has normally been reserved for high volume labs involving hundreds or thousands of feet of film in a linear processor. With companies like QWD that have made this available in a kit form for home use, this process now can be done on a small scale. ECN-2 kits sold to consumers often don't comply with process standards dictated by Kodak and therefore results may significantly vary in quality and consistency.

References

 Hanson, Wesley T. Jr. "Color Negative and Color Positive Film for Motion Picture Use." Journal of the SMPTE, March 1952, Volume 58, pages 223–238.

Kodak
Photographic film processes